Euplax leptophthalmus is a species of crab in the family Macrophthalmidae. It was described by H. Milne-Edwards in 1852.

References

Ocypodoidea
Crustaceans described in 1852